Labdia fletcherella is a moth in the family Cosmopterigidae. It was described by John David Bradley in 1951. It is known from India.

References

Arctiidae genus list at Butterflies and Moths of the World of the Natural History Museum

Labdia
Moths described in 1951